The Irish Kennel Club or IKC is an organization dedicated to supporting dog breeds and their owners. It maintains a register of purebred dogs in Ireland, issuing pedigree certificates, transfer of ownership certification and export licenses where required.

History
The number of Kerry Blue Terriers increased dramatically in the Dublin area as the breed gained admirers in the early 1920s. On St. Patrick's Day 1921, a conformation dog show was organized which included other breeds, in opposition to The Kennel Club of the UK. The popularity of the show was the catalyst that led to the formation of the Irish Kennel Club. The first meeting was held on January 20, 1922.

Affiliation
Today, it is a member of the Fédération Cynologique Internationale.

See also
Teastas Mor

References

External links

Show Dogs Ireland, a magazine catering to the Irish show dog industry
IKC St. Patrick's Celtic Winners dog show 2007 

Kennel clubs
Organizations established in 1922
Fédération Cynologique Internationale
1922 establishments in Ireland
Organisations based in Dublin (city)